XHAW-TDT, virtual channel 6 (UHF digital channel 25), is the flagship station of the Multimedios television network, licensed to Monterrey, Nuevo León, Mexico. The station is owned by Grupo Multimedios.

Digital television

Digital channels

The station's digital signal is multiplexed:

XHAW and sister station XHSAW broadcast in HDTV; XHSAW formerly shared virtual channel 12. XHSAW broadcasts on channels 12.1 through 12.4; XHAW broadcasts channels 6.1 and 6.2. 6.1 and 6.2 are the only channels available in Saltillo and Guadalupe/Juárez/Cadereyta, as there is no shadow XHSAW there. Even though XHAW broadcast on analog channel 11 in Saltillo, it used virtual channel 12 there even prior to 2016. On February 24, 2018 (the station's 50th anniversary date), the station began to use the channel 6 virtual channel along with most other Multimedios stations as part of the network's national expansion.

XHAW Saltillo broadcast on physical channel 51 because channel 25 was in use by analog XHSTC-TV there. It was relocated to channel 25 after the digital television transition.

Analog-to-digital conversion

On September 24, 2015, XHAW shut off its analog signals, both in Monterrey and Saltillo; its digital signals remained.

References

External links
Multimedios Television

Television stations in Monterrey
Grupo Multimedios
Television channels and stations established in 1968
Spanish-language television stations in Mexico
Canal 6 (Mexico)